Tha Pla is a district (amphoe) of Uttaradit province, in Northern Thailand.

History
Tha Pla was originally part of Nan province until it was reassigned in 1923 to Uttaradit Province.

Geography
Neighbouring districts are (from the east in a clockwise order): Nam Pat, Thong Saen Khan and Mueang Uttaradit of Uttaradit Province, Den Chai, Sung Men and Mueang Phrae of Phrae province, and Na Muen of Nan province.

The main river of the district is the Nan River, with the Sirikit Dam creating a 250 km2 artificial lake. The Pat River joins the Nan below the dam.

Administration

Central administration 
Tha Pla is divided into seven sub-districts (tambon), which are further subdivided into 76 administrative villages (Muban).

Number 6 belonged to the subdistrict Tha Faek reassigned to Nam Pat District in 2015.

Local administration 
There are three sub-district municipalities (thesaban tambon) in the district:

 Tha Pla consisting of parts of sub-district Tha Pla.
 Ruam Chit consisting of parts of sub-district Ruam Chit.
 Charim consisting of sub-district Charim.

There are six sub-district administrative organizations (SAO) in the district:

 Tha Pla consisting of parts of sub-district Tha Pla.
 Hat La consisting of sub-district Hat La.
 Pha Lueat consisting of sub-district Pha Lueat.
 Nam Man consisting of sub-district Nam Man.
 Nang Phaya consisting of sub-district Nang Phaya.
 Ruam Chit consisting of parts of sub-district Ruam Chit.

Local festival
Phi Talok (lit: funny ghost) - a post Buddhist Lent festival (around October) of Tha Pla, this ghost mask festival has dual names. While Tha Pla people call this ‘Phi Talok,’ those in Hat La or Tha Faek know it as ‘Phi Hua Khon’ (Khon mask ghost). But whatever the name, this event is all about the belief in heaven and hell. This festival is similar to Phi Ta Khon of Dan Sai district, Loei province and has been organized continuously for over 200 years.

References

External links
 Amphoe.com 

Tha Pla